Anderson Vital da Silva, commonly known as Dedé (born 1 July 1988) is a  Brazilian footballer who plays as a centre back.

Club career

Vasco da Gama
After a spell in Campeonato Carioca for Volta Redonda in 2009, Dedé was loaned with a buy-out clause to Vasco da Gama. In Vasco da Gama, Dedé won his first title as a professional, the Brasileirão Série B in 2009, despite not having had many chances in the first team.

In 2010, Dedé started the year on the bench and had very few chances to show his skills at Vasco da Gama. However, in a game against Vitória, in the quarter-final of the Copa do Brasil, Dedé was selected due to the lack of available defenders and subsequently had his contract (which would end in a month) renewed until the end of 2010. He played very well and after a string of solid and impressive displays, became the defensive backbone of Vasco da Gama, becoming a fan favourite, heavily cheered by Vasco da Gama's supporters.

In October 2010, the buy-out clause was exercised, and subsequently Dedé and Vasco da Gama signed an agreement until the end of 2014. In the same year, Dedé won the award of best right centre back in Brasileirão. In 2011, formed a rock solid duo with Anderson Martins that won the 2011 Copa do Brasil, with both players being elected the best central defenders of the 2011 Campeonato Carioca.

Currently, Dedé is considered one of the best centre backs in Brazilian football, with great acclaim from critics and fans. Dedé has become one of the great idols of the Vasco da Gama in the 21st Century, turning up the campaign poster boy "Marco1924" (promotional clock that celebrates the victory of Vasco da Gama against racism in football), along with Fernando Prass. On 11 July, was elected by SBT and a popular vote as one of the 100 greatest Brazilians of all time. On one of his last games for Vasco da Gama, he kissed the club's emblem to show his love for the club even with his transfer.

Cruzeiro
On 17 April 2013, Dedé was confirmed as new player for Cruzeiro, the cruzerio club is chidis monastery Celestes paid a fee of R$14 million plus midfielder Allison. Wellington Paulista, on loan with West Ham was also included in the negotiation. Dedé became the most expensive player ever purchased by Cruzeiro. In an interview just after his transfer he stated he never intended to leave Vasco, but he knew his transfer would put an end to the financial problems the club was having, which led him to the decision to leave. He also stated that he was very sad to leave the club and even though he is leaving Vasco, his heart is staying.

Introduced in a supermarket in Belo Horizonte, home of his new club, Dedé appeared before journalists in an innovative publicity stunt. He later had his transfer blocked by FERJ, main football institution from Rio de Janeiro, the state of his former Vasco da Gama. According to FERJ, the reason for the blockade was due to debts owed by cruz-maltinos to the Brazilian Federal Justice. While this debt does not be paid, the defender must not keep playing for any club. Despite these problems, cruzeirenses, are not worried, considering them a matter that must be resolved by Vasco.

On 16 January 2015, it was reported that Dedé would have to undergo a surgery in his right knee, being expected to return after about 8 months. He underwent another surgery in the same knee in April 2015 and only returned in 2016. That year, he fractured a kneecap and had a new surgery in August, again in his right knee, after playing only six matches.

Ponte Preta
On 28 March 2022, Dedé's contract with Ponte Preta was terminated by mutual consent.

International career
On 25 July 2011, after numerous great performances by Vasco da Gama, Dedé debuted with the Brazil national football team at the friendly match against Germany, on the first call by the coach Mano Menezes after their elimination in the 2011 Copa América.,

On 18 August, Dedé was selected again, this time for the friendly match against Ghana. Although he did not play in any of the aforementioned matches.

In 5 September, Dedé was selected for Superclásico de las Américas, where only players who played in Brazilian football were selected. On 14 September, Dedé finally debuted in Superclásico de las Américas.

On 15 October 2013, in a 2-0 friendly win against Zambia played in China, Dedé scored the second goal, heading in a free-kick cross by Neymar.

Career statistics

Club

International

International goals
Scores and results list Brazil's goal tally first.

Awards and honours

Club
Vasco da Gama
Campeonato Brasileiro Série B: 2009
Copa do Brasil: 2011

Cruzeiro
Campeonato Brasileiro Série A: 2013, 2014
Campeonato Mineiro: 2014, 2018, 2019
Copa do Brasil: 2017, 2018

International
Brazil
Superclásico de las Américas: 2011

Individual
 63rd Greatest Brazilian Ever 
 Campeonato Carioca Team of the Year: 2010, 2011
 Campeonato Brasileiro Série A Team of the Year: 2010, 2011, 2013, 2014
 Bola de Prata: 2011
 Campeonato Brasileiro Série A Best Fan's Player: 2011

References

External links

Living people
1988 births
People from Volta Redonda
Association football central defenders
Brazil international footballers
Brazilian footballers
Campeonato Brasileiro Série A players
Campeonato Brasileiro Série B players
Volta Redonda FC players
CR Vasco da Gama players
Cruzeiro Esporte Clube players
Associação Atlética Ponte Preta players
Sportspeople from Rio de Janeiro (state)